Terry Eviston (born 17 July 1957 in Dublin) was a footballer who played for Home Farm, Bohemians, Athlone Town A.F.C., Dundalk F.C. and two spells with Shamrock Rovers. He is the current manager of Raheny United in the Women's National League (Ireland).

Playing career
Eviston made his League of Ireland debut for Home Farm at Tolka Park on 2 November 1975. On 7 August 1976 Home Farm played Everton in a pre season friendly at Goodison Park. Twenty years later the same club provided the opposition in Eviston's testimonial.

In 1978, he joined Bohemians and was their top scorer in the league in 1980/81 with 9 goals from 20 games (1 as substitute). In total he played 110 league games (99 plus 11 as sub) scoring 31 league goals. He made a scoring debut for Bohs on 10 September 1978. He made 6 appearances in European competition for Bohs against AC Omonia and Dynamo Dresden in the 1978–79 European Cup and Sporting Clube de Portugal in the 1979–80 UEFA Cup.

On 30 April 1980 he represented the League of Ireland against Argentina at the River Plate Stadium where Diego Maradona scored in a 1–0 defeat and on 3 September 1981 Terry was part of a League of Ireland side that played Brazil in Maceió. During that season he was the club captain at Dalymount. His last game for Bohs was the 1983 FAI Cup Final loss.

After five seasons at Dalymount Park Rovers new manager Jim McLaughlin (footballer) signed Terry in July 1983. In his first season at Milltown, Rovers won the League for the first time in twenty years.

After 2 goals in 25 total appearances Terry transferred to Athlone Town A.F.C. in November 1984. He made his debut at Sligo on the 18th and until he signed for Dundalk in the summer of 1986 he played in all 43 league games in that period.

In his seven years at Oriel Park he won the League twice, the FAI Cup once and the League of Ireland Cup twice and won the Soccer Writers' Personality of the Year award in 1987–88. He was also Player of the Month in March 1988. He also made 6 appearances in European competition for Dundalk against AFC Ajax in the 1987–88 European Cup Winners' Cup, against Red Star Belgrade in the 1988–89 European Cup and Budapest Honvéd FC in the 1991–92 European Cup.

In the 1990-91 League of Ireland season Eviston was everpresent in the league scoring 10 goals as Dundalk won the league on the last day at Cork with Eviston playing a role in Tom McNulty's winner.

He rejoined Rovers in the summer of 1993 and scored 6 goals in 25 appearances as he picked up his fourth League medal in his first season back in the Hoops. He made one appearance for Rovers in the 1994-95 UEFA Cup. His last game for Rovers was the final game of the 1995-96 League of Ireland season.

In May 1996 a League of Ireland XI played Everton in Eviston's testimonial at Dalymount Park.

He won an Irish amateur cap against Greece in 1978 and an Olympic cap against Hungary in 1986.

His 101st and last League of Ireland goal was the winner for Cobh against Galway United on 20 September 1997. Cobh goalkeeper Nicky Byrne saved a penalty to ensure the home side their first win of that season.

At the end of the 2012 League of Ireland season Newe is joint forty first in the all-time League of Ireland goalscoring list with 101 league goals

Eviston was naturally left footed and brave in the air, a proficient crosser with close control. His versatility shone through as he played outside left, striker and left back. Passionate and the ultimate team player his goal celebrations were always memorable.

Management career
After the sacking of Ray Treacy in January 1996 Terry, along with Alan O'Neill, was appointed manager of the club.

Alan and Terry were surprisingly sacked after two games of the 1996–97 season. He then went on to be player/manager at Athlone Town F.C. where he scored his 100th league goal.

In June 1999 he was appointed manager of Dundalk who were then in the League of Ireland First Division. In May 2000 his contract was not renewed.

In July 2004 he was appointed assistant to Roddy Collins at Dublin City F.C. In November 2004 both moved to Shamrock Rovers. When Roddy Collins was sacked at the end of that season Terry left the club. Terry is currently manager of Raheny United in the Women's National League (Ireland).

Honours

As a player
League of Ireland: 4
 Shamrock Rovers 1983/84, 1993/1994
 Dundalk F.C. 1987/88, 1990/1991
FAI Cup: 1
 Dundalk F.C. 1988
League of Ireland Cup: 3
 Dundalk F.C. 1987, 1990
 Bohemian F.C. 1979
 Leinster Senior Cup (association football): 2
 Bohemians – 1978/79, 1979/80
LFA President's Cup
 Shamrock Rovers 1984/85
SWAI Personality of the Year: 1
 Dundalk F.C. 1987/88

As a manager
FAI Women's Cup
 Raheny United 2013

References

Sources
 The Hoops by Paul Doolan and Robert Goggins
 Terry Eviston Testimonial Match Programme 10 May 1996

1957 births
Living people
Association footballers from County Dublin
League of Ireland managers
Republic of Ireland association footballers
Association football forwards
Home Farm F.C. players
Bohemian F.C. players
Shamrock Rovers F.C. players
Athlone Town A.F.C. players
Dundalk F.C. players
Dundalk F.C. managers
Cobh Ramblers F.C. players
Athlone Town A.F.C. managers
Shamrock Rovers F.C. managers
League of Ireland players
League of Ireland XI players
Raheny United F.C.
Women's National League (Ireland) managers
Republic of Ireland football managers